Leaders of the New School was an American hip hop group based in Long Island, New York.

History
The crew was composed of Uniondale, New York, natives Charlie Brown (born Bryan Higgins on September 19, 1970) and Dinco D (born James Jackson on November 4, 1971); North Amityville, New York native Cut Monitor Milo (born Sheldon Scott on July 4, 1970); and Busta Rhymes (born Trevor Smith, Jr. on May 20, 1972), who was originally from Brooklyn, New York but later moved to Uniondale at the age of twelve. The group's big break came when they became an opening act for hip hop group Public Enemy. Public Enemy's Chuck D gave Busta Rhymes and Charlie Brown their stage names. The group wanted to call itself "Leaders of the New School", a name that was sought by a white hip hop group Hank Shocklee of The Bomb Squad was producing. To settle who would get the name, according to Busta Rhymes, Chuck D sent the two groups home to make a track called "Fuck the Old School", and the group that The Bomb Squad "felt the most" would get to use the name. After Rhymes and Brown's group earned the name Leaders of the New School, the white group was named Young Black Teenagers.

Leaders of the New School made its first appearance on an Elektra Records compilation titled Rubáiyát: Elektra's 40th Anniversary, with a song called "Mt. Airy Groove". It was the only hip hop song on that album. LONS soon joined up with popular hip hop collective the Native Tongues, along with the Jungle Brothers, De La Soul, A Tribe Called Quest, and Black Sheep.

In 1991, Busta Rhymes, Dinco D and Charlie Brown made a guest appearance on A Tribe Called Quest's hit single "Scenario", and LONS joined ATCQ on The Arsenio Hall Show to perform the track with the group. The group's debut album, A Future Without a Past..., was also released in 1991. It included the hits "Case of the P.T.A.", "Sobb Story", and "The International Zone Coaster". The group was praised for its light-hearted content and old-school call-and-response deliveries.

The group's second and final album was T.I.M.E. ("The Inner Mind's Eye"), released in 1993, and spawning the fan-favorite singles "What's Next", "Time Will Tell" & "Classic Material".

As time passed, fans and critics began to focus less on LONS as a group and more on Busta Rhymes as a solo artist. During an infamous appearance on the TV show Yo! MTV Raps, the group was seen arguing, with member Charlie Brown becoming upset over Rhymes' show-stealing. The group soon split up, with Charlie Brown, Dinco D and Milo garnering very limited success individually, while Busta Rhymes' popularity continued to increase.

The group made an appearance on Rhymes' 1996 debut album The Coming, on the track "Keep It Movin'" and was the last time they would collaborate as a group. In July 2012, the group reunited on stage during Busta Rhymes' headlining set at the Brooklyn Hip-Hop Festival, to perform "Case of the P.T.A." and "Scenario" in its entirety with A Tribe Called Quest. The group later reunited again in 2015 on the song "We Home" from Busta Rhymes' mixtape The Return Of The Dragon: The Abstract Went On Vacation.

Reunion
The group reunited for two shows in 2012. Dinco D released his debut solo album Cameo Flows on November 4, 2016. The album features appearances by fellow members Charlie Brown and Cut Monitor Milo.

In December 2016, Dinco D and Charlie Brown announced on The Library With Tim Einenkel podcast that the group was working on new material together but did not give any indication to when it would be released. The following month, Busta Rhymes made similar comments on N.O.R.E. & DJ EFN's Drink Champs podcast.

Discography

References

East Coast hip hop groups
Elektra Records artists
Five percenters
Musical groups established in 1986
Musical groups disestablished in 1994
Musical groups from Long Island
Native Tongues Posse
Rappers from New York (state)